Fragmento preliminar al estudio del derecho is an 1837 book by Juan Bautista Alberdi. It is an analysis of the legal system of Argentina at the time.

Bibliography
 

Books by Juan Bautista Alberdi
1837 non-fiction books